Damaschke Field, officially Dutch Damaschke Stadium, is a sports playing field and stadium in Oneonta, New York. Primarily used for baseball, the field has been a municipal landmark for over a hundred years.

History
The original baseball field was officially opened on Memorial Day in 1905 under the name Elm Park. Numerous stars from the early years of US baseball, including Babe Ruth and Rogers Hornsby, drew large crowds at the field for semi-pro and exposition games. A permanent steel grandstand was erected for spectators in 1938.

In August 1968, the city renamed the site as Dutch Damaschke Stadium to honor local sports coach, referee, and counselor Ernest C. "Dutch" Damaschke, who had served as Oneonta's Recreation Commissioner for more than thirty years. The field and stadium are administered as public facilities within Oneonta's large Neahwa Park.

The site was the longtime home of the area's minor league baseball team, the Oneonta Red Sox (1966), Oneonta Yankees (1967–1998), Oneonta Tigers (1999–2009). The field has also regularly hosted the Oneonta Indians football team, the Oneonta United soccer team, and the Hartwick College baseball team. It is currently the home field of the Oneonta Outlaws, a collegiate summer baseball team in the Perfect Game Collegiate Baseball League.

A few games were staged here in late May of 1969 by the Syracuse Chiefs of the International League while their home field MacArthur Stadium was being repaired after a fire.

References

External links
City of Oneonta Department of Recreation
Damaschke Field Views - Ball Parks of the Minor Leagues
Photographs of Damaschke Field - Rochester Area Ballparks

Sports venues in Otsego County, New York
Minor league baseball venues
Baseball venues in New York (state)
1905 establishments in New York (state)
Sports venues completed in 1905
Soccer venues in New York (state)
College baseball venues in the United States